Roberto Stellone (born 22 July 1977) is an Italian football manager and former footballer who played as a forward. He is the current head coach of  club Benevento.

Club career

Early career
Son of former footballer Gaetano Stellone, Roberto Stellone starter his career at hometown club Lodigiani, where he met David Di Michele, his team-mate at Reggina and Torino. After 4 seasons in Serie C1, he left for Lucchese of Serie B in mid-1997. In the summer of 1998, he left for Parma, but he had limited opportunities at the club and left for fellow Serie B side Lecce on loan, in January 1999. He made a name for himself throughout the remainder of the season, as he scored 6 goals in 19 league matches, helping the team to win Serie A promotion, and receiving a call-up to the Italy U21 team.

Napoli
In the summer of 1999, he left for Serie B side S.S.C. Napoli in a co-ownership deal. He added 10 more goals to his Serie B tally, which also helped Napoli win Serie A promotion, after finishing the season in 4th place. At the end of the season, Napoli bought Stellone's remaining registration rights, keeping him at the club. However, despite scoring on his Serie A debut the following season, in a 2–1 home defeat to Juventus on 30 September 2000, Stellone's league appearances in his first Serie A season were limited to just 3 due to injury, and as a result, Napoli were unable to avoid relegation. Stellone remained with Napoli in Serie B for the 2001–02 and 2002–03 seasons, scoring 19 goals in 51 matches, but missing out on several matches once again due to injury, however; in the summer of 2002, he was named the club's new captain. Facing financial difficulties, Napoli loaned Stellone to Serie A side Reggina during the 2003–04 season. Due to the presence of strikers David Di Michele and Emiliano Bonazzoli, Stellone struggled to find space in the team, and scored only once in 16 league appearances.

The next season, he left for Serie B side Genoa, where he partnered with Diego Milito and Stephen Makinwa up-front, and scored over 70% of team's total goals. Although the team won the Serie B championship, the club was later penalised and awarded last place due to their involvement in the Caso Genoa, and as a result suffered relegation to Serie C.

Torino
Stellone was signed by Serie B runner-up Torino in co-ownership deal in August 2005, who were forced to remain at Serie B due to financial difficulty. Now partnered with Enrico Fantini and Roberto Muzzi in attack, Stellone failed to replicate his prolific performances at Geona, scoring 7 goals in 31 appearances, but Torino still bought him outright, outbidding Genoa. Despite Stellone's struggle to find the back of the net consistently, Torino still managed to obtain Serie A promotion that season. With Torino in Serie A the following season, he alternated playing as a starter and as a substitute for the club. Although Stellone and the club's other strikers failed to score, with help of Alessandro Rosina and a strong defensive line, the team still managed to avoid Serie B relegation. The next season, with the signings of David Di Michele, Nicola Ventola and Álvaro Recoba, Stellone only made 18 starts, scoring just 4 goals. In his last season with the club, the 31-year-old forward faced competition from Rolando Bianchi and Nicola Amoruso; following the team's change of formation, which only used one striker, usually Bianchi, Stellone made half of his appearances as substitute. With the departure of Alessandro Rosina in January 2009, the team struggled to score, and ultimately failed to stay in Serie A on the final match-day of the season.

Frosinone
After the relegation of Torino in 2009, he became free agent in June. After months without a club, he signed a 3-year contract with Serie B club Frosinone in November 2009 where he was coached by Francesco Moriero. In the 2009–10 season his goals contributed to helping the team avoid relegation; following the club's relegation to Lega Pro the following year, on 28 June 2011, he announced his retirement from football.

Style of play
A complete striker, Stellone could act either as a main striker or as a second striker, due to his vision, ability to score goals, hold up the ball in tight spaces, and create chances for team-mates. Despite his height and imposing physique, which enabled him excel in the air, he was also known for his dynamism and technique; indeed, his main qualities a forward were his dribbling and heading ability.

Managerial career 
After his retirement, he stayed at Frosinone as a youth coach in charge of the under-19 team (Berretti) for the 2011–12 season. Under his tenure, the team won the national Berretti title.

Frosinone
Thanks also to his impressive results with the youth team, Stellone was appointed as Frosinone head coach role for the season 2012–13 in Lega Pro Prima Divisione. In his first season in charge, Stellone guided the team to seventh place and was confirmed for one more year.

In the 2013–14 Lega Pro Prima Divisione, Stellone's Frosinone immediately emerged as one of the promotion favourites, losing direct promotion only on the last matchday to Perugia. In the subsequent playoff tournament, however, Frosinone managed to achieve the ultimate goal of getting back into Serie B, defeating Salernitana in the first round, Pisa in the semi-finals and, most notably, a Fabrizio Miccoli-led Lecce in a two-legged final after extra time.

On 16 May 2015, he led Frosinone to second place in Serie B and direct promotion to Serie A with a game to spare, with victory against Crotone 3–1. On 7 March 2016, Stellone won the Panchina d’Argento for the previous 2014–15 season. On 8 May 2016, Frosinone were relegated back to Serie B after one season in Serie A. One day after Frosinone's last match of the Serie A season, on 15 May, Stellone was relieved of his managerial duties.

Bari
On 4 July 2016, Stellone was appointed manager of Bari. He was sacked on 7 November.

Palermo
Stellone was appointed manager of Serie B club Palermo on 28 April 2018, taking over from Bruno Tedino, with five games to go and the team in third place, level on points with second-placed Parma. He ended the season in fourth place, behind second-placed Parma and third-placed Frosinone.

After defeating Venezia on the semi-finals, Palermo was defeated 2–3 on aggregate by Frosinone in a two-legged final. This marked the end of Stellone's tenure, as he was not confirmed for the new season, with Tedino being reappointed as head coach.

On 26 September 2018, he was reinstated as Palermo head following a 1–2 loss to Brescia on the fifth matchday of the season. Stellone started his second tenure in a very impressive fashion, as he successfully led Palermo to a streak of positive results that brought the Rosanero back on top of the league table by December. He was sacked on 23 April 2019.

Ascoli
Stellone was appointed manager of Ascoli on 3 February 2020. He was sacked on 16 April 2020.

Arezzo
On 18 January 2021 he was hired by Serie C club Arezzo in place of Andrea Camplone. Arezzo was relegated to Serie D at the end of the season, and Stellone left the club.

Reggina
On 24 January 2022, Stellone was named new manager of Serie B club Reggina, thus becoming the third manager of the season for the Calabrians. He guided Reggina safely above the relegation zone with a 14th place finish in Serie B. His contract was not renewed following the sale of the club.

Benevento
On 6 February 2023, Stellone was appointed head coach of struggling Serie B club Benevento, replacing Fabio Cannavaro.

Career statistics

Managerial statistics

Honours
Individual
 Panchina d'Oro Lega Pro: 2013–14 Lega Pro
 Panchina d’Argento: 2014–15

References

External links
Profile at FIGC 
Profile at Football.it 
Profile at Torino 
Profile at La Gazzetta dello Sport 

1977 births
Living people
Footballers from Rome
Association football forwards
Italian footballers
Italian football managers
A.S. Lodigiani players
S.S.D. Lucchese 1905 players
Parma Calcio 1913 players
U.S. Lecce players
S.S.C. Napoli players
Reggina 1914 players
Genoa C.F.C. players
Torino F.C. players
Frosinone Calcio players
Serie A players
Serie B players
Serie C players
Frosinone Calcio managers
S.S.C. Bari managers
Palermo F.C. managers
Ascoli Calcio 1898 F.C. managers
Reggina 1914 managers
Benevento Calcio managers